Penholoway Creek is a stream in the U.S. state of Georgia. It is a tributary to the Altamaha River.

Name
Penholoway is a name derived from the Creek language meaning "high foot log".

Many variant names have been recorded, including:
Fin Halloway Creek
Finhalloway Creek
Finholloway Creek
Finholoway River
Finn Halloway Creek
Pen Holloway Creek
Penholloway Creek
Phaenehalloway Creek
Phenholloway Creek
Phennohaloway Creek
Phin Holloway Creek
Phin Holloway River
Phinholloway Creek
Phinhotoway Creek
Pin Holloway Creek
Pinholloway Creek
Turkey Creek
Turkie Creek

References

Rivers of Georgia (U.S. state)
Rivers of Wayne County, Georgia